Mulleria is a small town located in Karadka Panchayath, Kasaragod district in Kerala, India.

Transportation
The western main road from Mulleria to Kasaragod has access to the NH.66, which connects to Mangalore in the north and Kannur in the south. The road to the east connects to Sullia in Karnataka, from where Mysore and Bangalore can be accessed. Moreover, we can easily access to Puttur via Sulliapadav, Karnataka. The nearest railway station is Kasaragod on the Mangalore-Palakkad line. There is International Airport at Mangalore on North. Mulleria town is connect to four major road, which is connect throughout Badiadka, Kumble, Mangalore in the north. And north west connect to Natakal, Belluru, Sulliapadav, Puttur through GG Road. In the western Cherkala to Kasaragod and east connected to Bangaluru through Mysore and Coorg.

Overview

Mulleria is a small village/hamlet in Kasargod Taluk in Kasaragod District of Kerala, India. It comes under Karaduka Panchayath. It belongs to North Kerala Division. It is located 22 km to the east of District headquarters Kasaragod. 16 km from Kasargod. 575 km from State capital Thiruvananthapuram. Kumbadaje (7 km), Badiyadka (11 km), Enmakaje (14 km), Chengala (16 km) are the nearby villages to Mulleria. Mulleria is surrounded by Kanhangad Taluk towards South, Puttur Taluk towards North, Manjeshwar Taluk towards west, Sulya Taluk towards East. Kasaragod, Puttur, Kanhangad, Payyannur are the nearby cities to Mulleria. It is near to Arabian sea. There is a chance of humidity in the weather.

Locality Name : Mulleria 

Taluk Name : Kasargod

District : Kasaragod

State : Kerala

Division : North Kerala

Language : Malayalam, English, kannada, Tulu

Elevation / Altitude: 18 meters. Above Sea level

Telephone Code / Std Code: 04994

Assembly constituency : Kasaragod Assembly Constituency

Member of Legislative Assembly : N. A. Nellikkunnu

Lok Sabha constituency : Kasaragod (Lok Sabha constituency)

Member of Parliament : P. Karunakaran

Pin Code : 671543

Post Office Name : Mulleria/Adhur

Main Village Name : Karaduka

Alternate Village Name : Adhur Village

Police station: Adhur

Details of Post Office MULLERIA, KASARGOD

Post Office: MULLERIA

Post Office Type: SUB OFFICE

District: KASARGOD

State: KERALA

Pin Code: 671543

Contact Address: Postmaster, Post Office MULLERIA (SUB OFFICE), KASARGOD, KERALA (KL), India (IN), Pin Code:- 671543

Delivery Status:- DELIVERY

Postal Taluk:- KASARAGOD

Postal Division:- KASARAGOD

Postal Region:- CALICUT

Postal Circle:- KERALA

Clubs

1. Shri Vishnu Arts & Sports Club
2. AASC AMBIKANAGAR
3. NASC Natakal. 
4.Eleven star Adhur.
5.Chethana Arts & Sports club
6.Sri Ram cricketers.
7.Nava chethana Beerangole.
8.Seva bharathi
9.Safdar hasmi Gadigudda
10.Red star Karmanthody
11.ayodya friends mulleria
12. Sri Bharathamba Gadigudde
13. Navajyothi Arts & sports club Kanakkod
14. Pournami Adukkam
15.Rising sports & Arts Club poovadka

Educational Institution
 
 ALPS MULLERIA
 AUPS MULLERIA
 GVHSS MULLERIA
 BEJA MODEL COLLEGE OF ARTS AND SCIENCE
 VOCATIONAL HIGHER SECONDARY ARTS AND SCIENCE
 Kasaragod Taluk IT Education
 Vidhyashree Sikshana Kendra

About Karadka

According to Census 2011 information the location code or village code of Karadka village is 627111. Karadka village is located in Kasaragod Tehsil of Kasaragod district in Kerala, India. It is situated 23 km away from Kasaragod, which is both district & sub-district headquarter of Karadka village. As per 2009 stats, Karadka village is also a gram panchayat.

The total geographical area of village is 1859 hectares. Karadka has a total population of 9,613 peoples. There are about 2,158 houses in Karadka village. Kasaragod is nearest town to Karadka which is approximately 23 km away.

Population of Karadka

Total Population 9,613	
	
Male Population 4,693

Female Population 4,920

Nearby villages of Karadka

Ubrangala
Kumbadaje
Nettanige
Bellur
Adhur
Muliyar
Kolathur
Bedadka
Munnad
Kuttikole
Karivedakam

Tourism

Kasaragod is often named as land of Lords and Forts. It has 9 rivers (out of a total of the 44 rivers that flow in Kerala), hills, beaches, backwaters, as well as temples, churches, mosques and forts. Mulleria is known for its rich culture and natural environment. Temples, mosque, are mainly attracted so many pilgrims to Mulleria .

1. Payashwini River
2. Adhur Panchalingeshwara Temple
3. Adhur Mosque and Uroos
4. Yakshagana events at Mulleria
5. Ganesha Chaturthi
6. Kanchana Ganga Kalagrama
7. Jambri Festival

Auditoriums

1.Ganesh Kala Mandir

2.Kalyan Auditorium

Image gallery

See also
 Adhur
 Muliyar
 Karadka
 Delampady

External links
Google Earth view

References

Cherkala - Jalsoor Rd